John Lee (January 30, 1788 – May 17, 1871) was a Maryland planter and politician who served a single term in the United States House of Representatives and also served in both houses of the Maryland legislature.

Early and family life

Born on October 12, 1787 at "Needwood", near Frederick, Maryland. His father, Thomas Sim Lee was a prominent planter, patriot and politician, who had twice served as Maryland's governor. His mother, the former Mary Digges, was also from a prominent Maryland family. He received a private education appropriate to his class, then traveled to Cambridge, Massachusetts where he studied law at Harvard University. He also served in the Maryland militia during the War of 1812.

Career

Planter

Lee  did not practice law, but rather primarily managed his estate, "Needwood", which he farmed mostly using enslaved labor, as had his father. In the 1830 federal census, his household also included two free elderly Black men and two free middle-aged Black women, as well as 55 enslaved Blacks. and also rented out two enslaved people elsewhere in Frederick County.  In the 1850 federal census, he owned 36 enslaved people in Frederick county, and 30 enslaved people in the last census before the American Civil War.
In 1843, his son, named like this man's father Thomas Sim Lee, built a mansion at Needwood, now in Burkittsville, Maryland that is eligible for inclusion on the National Register for Historic Places.

Politician

Meanwhile, decades earlier, following his father's death, Lee began his own political career. He won election as a Jackson Federalist to the Eighteenth Congress (March 4, 1823 – March 3, 1825).  He served as chairman of the committee of the House of Representatives appointed to escort the Marquis de Lafayette from Frederick City to Washington in 1825.

Later, Lee served as member of the Maryland Senate and still later represented Federick County in the Maryland House of Delegates. He advocated for the Chesapeake & Ohio Canal (which was built in the 1830s), and later for the Baltimore & Ohio Railroad (which finally superceded it). When Lee retired from public life, he resumed management of his estate.

Personal life

He married Harriet Carroll, whose father Charles Carroll and mother the former Harriett Chew also came from distinguished Maryland familis. They had two sons who lived to adulthood. Charles Carroll Lee and Thomas Sim Lee.

Death and legacy

He died on May 17, 1871 while on a visit to his son in New York City, and is interred in New Cathedral Cemetery, familiarly called "Bonnie Brae," in Baltimore, Maryland.

References

1788 births
1871 deaths
Members of the Maryland House of Delegates
Maryland state senators
Harvard University alumni
People from Frederick County, Maryland
Federalist Party members of the United States House of Representatives from Maryland
Jacksonian members of the United States House of Representatives from Maryland
19th-century American politicians